Raiamas senegalensis (silver fish,  Senegal trout barb or Senegal minnow) is a species of cyprinid fish in the genus Raiamas from western Africa east to the River Nile. It sometimes is found in the aquarium trade.

Description
Raiamas senegalensis has eleven dorsal soft rays and 16 anal soft rays. It is usually marked with less than 15 vertical bars on its sides and a round spot on caudal peduncle. The background colour is silvery with a greyish green dorsum, the vertical bars decrease in size towards the head. It is not sexually dimorphic.

Distribution 
Raiamas senegalensis is found in western Africa as far east at the Nile basin. It is found in the basins of the Nile, Lake Chad, Niger, Gambia, Senegal, Volta and the coastal basins of Sassandra, Bandama, Comoé, Tano, Pra, Ouémé, Ogun and Sanaga, which seems to represent its southern distributional limit; it is also known from the Cross River in Cameroon. This means that the countries this species has been recorded in are Benin, Burkina Faso, Cameroon, Central African Republic, Chad, Egypt, Ethiopia, Gambia, Ghana, Guinea, Ivory Coast Mali, Niger, Nigeria, Senegal, Sudan and Togo.

Habitat and ecology
Raiamas senegalensis is a freshwater demersal fish. It is predatory planktophage of non insect plankton during the day but switches to insect plankton at night

Human use
Raiamas senegalensis is traded within the aquarium trade.

Conservation status
Raiamas senegalensis has a wide distribution, there are no known major widespread threats so it is therefore listed as Least Concern.

References 

senegalensis
Cyprinid fish of Africa
Freshwater fish of West Africa
Freshwater fish of Cameroon
Fish of the Central African Republic
Fish of Chad
Fish of Egypt
Fish of Ethiopia
Freshwater fish of Kenya
Fish of South Sudan
Fish of Sudan
Fish described in 1870
Taxa named by Franz Steindachner